Willis James Hulings (July 1, 1850 – August 8, 1924) was a Progressive and a Republican member of the U.S. House of Representatives from Pennsylvania.

Biography
Willis J. Hulings was born in Rimersburg, Pennsylvania. He attended the Kittanning Academy. He studied law and was admitted to practice in Pennsylvania, West Virginia, and Arizona. He became a civil engineer and was engaged in mining and the petroleum business.

Hulings was elected as a Republican to the Pennsylvania State House of Representatives and served from 1881 to 1887. He was a member of the Pennsylvania National Guard from 1876 to 1912, serving in the various grades from private to brigadier general. He served as a general in the United States Army during the Spanish–American War. He was a member of the Pennsylvania State Senate from 1906 to 1910. He was elected as a Progressive to the Sixty-third Congress. He was an unsuccessful candidate for reelection in 1914. He was elected as a Republican to the Sixty-sixth Congress, and was an unsuccessful candidate for reelection in 1920. He died in Oil City, Pennsylvania. Interment in Grove Hill Cemetery.

References

The Political Graveyard

External links
 

1850 births
1924 deaths
People from Clarion County, Pennsylvania
Progressive Party (1912) members of the United States House of Representatives from Pennsylvania
Republican Party members of the United States House of Representatives from Pennsylvania
Republican Party members of the Pennsylvania House of Representatives
Republican Party Pennsylvania state senators
United States Army generals